Mesiphiastus subtuberculatus is a species of beetle in the family Cerambycidae. It was described by White in 1858. It is known from Australia.

References

Pteropliini
Beetles described in 1858